Agrostis media is a species of grass in the family Poaceae. It is found only in Tristan da Cunha. Its natural habitats are subantarctic shrubland, subantarctic grassland, rocky areas, and rocky shores.

References

media
Least concern plants
Flora of Tristan da Cunha
Taxonomy articles created by Polbot